The Shadow Self is the sixth studio album released by Finnish vocalist Tarja Turunen. The record was released on 5 August 2016. The record produced two singles.

Background
The songwriting started just after the release of Colours in the Dark in 2013, and Tarja gave hints through her Facebook and Twitter accounts along the way. In the start of 2016, Tarja started to reveal more bits about the album and put up bits of lyrics on Facebook. Tarja also stated on her Twitter account that there would be two collaborations with two woman singers on the album.

On 17 October 2015, Tarja performed two new songs, "No Bitter End" and "Goldfinger", a James Bond theme cover, which would be the first glimpses of the new album.

On 14 March 2016, the artwork and album name finally got revealed, Turunen said that the title of The Shadow Self was inspired by Scottish singer Annie Lennox: "I came across an Annie Lennox interview some time ago on the internet, and I was reading about her speaking about 'the shadow self,' about a darker side of us all. Everybody has a darker side, and we should probably just appreciate that it exists, but especially we artists. We get a lot of inspiration from our darker side". On March 22, 2016, Earmusic released a snippet of "No Bitter End" on YouTube.

On 7 April 2016, Earmusic revealed the prequel named The Brightest Void, released on 3 June with nine tracks. It is an album by itself but also ties together with The Shadow Self. On 14 April 2016, Earmusic released a trailer for the coming video "No Bitter End", the whole video will be released on 20 April. On 27 May 2016, Tarja announced that The Brightest Void was available for streaming on Apple Music.
The album was once again mixed in Austin, Texas at '62 Studios by Tim Palmer.

The Shadow Self was influenced by the Yin-Yang concept. The Brightest Void represents the light and The Shadow Self represents the darkness.

Track listing

Personnel

Musicians

 Tarja Turunen – Vocals, Piano
 Christian Kretschmar – Keyboard
 Kevin Chown – Bass
 Max Lilja – Cello (Cut 3)
 Alex Scholpp – Guitar
 Doug Wimbish – Bass
 Julian Barrett
 Peter Barrett

Additional musicians
 Luis Conte – Percussion
 Mike Coolen – Drums
 Chad Smith – Drums (Cuts 2,3,11)
 Guillermo De Medio
 Izumi Kawakatsu
 Mervi Myllyoja 
 Atli Örvarsson
 Nico Polo 
 Fernando Scarcella 
 Torsten Stenzel 
 Mike Terrana 
 Toni Turunen – vocals on "Eagle Eye"
 Alissa White-Gluz – vocals on "Demons in You"
 Anders Wollbeck

Production
James Dooley – orchestral and choir arrangements
Bart Hendrickson – orchestral and choir arrangements
Mel Wesson
 Tim Palmer – mixing

Charts

Certifications and sales

References

External links
 Tarja-theshadowself.com
 Tarjaturunen.com

Tarja Turunen albums
2016 albums